Marco Leto (18 January 1931 – 21 April 2016) was an Italian film and television director and screenwriter. 

Born in Rome, Leto started his career in the 1950s as an assistant director in a large number of films. In 1965 he started a collaboration with RAI TV, for which he directed several serials and TV movies. After signing some screenplays, Leto made his film directorial debut in 1973, with the critically appreciated Black Holiday. In the following years he kept active both in cinema and in television.

Selected filmography
 Black Holiday (1973)
 Al piacere di rivederla (1976)

References

External links
 
 

1931 births
2016 deaths
Italian screenwriters
Italian male screenwriters
Italian television directors
Film directors from Rome
Nastro d'Argento winners